Ruellia  hapalotricha (syn. Eurychanes hapalotricha) is a species native to the Cerrado vegetation of Brazil.

References

hapalotricha
Flora of Brazil